Toms Run is a stream in the U.S. state of West Virginia. It is a tributary of the New River.

Toms Run was named from an incident when a settler named Thomas drowned in its waters.

See also
List of rivers of West Virginia

References

Rivers of Summers County, West Virginia
Rivers of West Virginia